{{Infobox comedian
| name         = Paula Poundstone
| image        = PaulaPoundstoneByPhilKonstantin.jpg
| caption      = Poundstone in 2008
| pseudonym    = 
| birth_date   = 
| birth_place  = Huntsville, Alabama, U.S.
| origin       = Sudbury, Massachusetts
| death_date   = 
| death_place  = 
| medium       = Standup comedy, television, radio, print, internet
| nationality  = American
| active       = 1979–present
| genre        = standup, improvisational comedy, crowd work, voice acting, commentator, interviewer
| subject      = Observational humor
| influences   = 
| children     = 3
| influenced   = 
| notable_work = {{ubl|Wait Wait... Don't Tell Me!|The Totally Unscientific Study of the Search for Human Happiness|Nobody Listens to Paula Poundstone, the comedy podcast|Cats, Cops and Stuff|Paula Poundstone Goes to Harvard|The French Trump Weekly Press Conference}}
}}
Paula Poundstone (born December 29, 1959) is an American stand-up comedian, author, actor, interviewer, and commentator. Beginning in the late 1980s, she performed a series of one-hour HBO comedy specials. She provided backstage commentary during the 1992 presidential election on The Tonight Show with Jay Leno. She is the host of the Starburns Audio podcast (previously a member of the Maximum Fun network) Nobody Listens to Paula Poundstone, which is the successor to the National Public Radio program Live from the Poundstone Institute. She is a frequent panelist on NPR's weekly news quiz show Wait Wait... Don't Tell Me, and was a recurring guest on the network's A Prairie Home Companion variety program during Garrison Keillor's years as host.

 Early life 
Poundstone was born in Huntsville, Alabama, the daughter of Vera, a housewife, and Jack Poundstone, an engineer. Her family moved to Sudbury, Massachusetts, about a month after her birth.

 Career 

Poundstone started doing stand-up comedy at open-mic nights in Boston in 1979. In the early 1980s, she traveled across the United States by Greyhound bus, stopping in at open-mic nights at comedy clubs en route. She stayed in San Francisco, where she became known for improvisational sets at Holy City Zoo on Clement Street and The Other Café comedy club in Cole Valley.

In 1984, Robin Williams saw her act and encouraged her to move to Los Angeles. She performed her act when Williams hosted an episode of Saturday Night Live. That year, Poundstone was cast in the movie Gremloids. She continued as a comedian and began appearing on several talk shows. In 1989, she won the American Comedy Award for "Best Female Stand-Up Comic".

In 1990, she wrote and starred in an HBO special called Cats, Cops and Stuff, for which she won a CableACE Award, making her the first woman to win the ACE for best Standup Comedy Special. In March 2019, comedian Tig Notaro named "Cats, Cops and Stuff" one of The 5 Funniest Stand-Up Specials Ever for TIME Magazine. Poundstone went on to another first with her second HBO stand-up special, Paula Poundstone Goes to Harvard, taped on campus in Sanders Theatre. Poundstone had her own Bravo special in 2006 as part of their three-part Funny Girls series, along with Caroline Rhea and Joan Rivers, titled Paula Poundstone: Look What the Cat Dragged In.Poundstone worked as a political correspondent for The Tonight Show during the 1992 US Presidential campaign and did field pieces for The Rosie O'Donnell Show in 1996. In 1993, Poundstone won a second CableACE Award for "Best Program Interviewer" for her HBO series The Paula Poundstone Show.  She was then featured in her own variety show, The Paula Poundstone Show, on ABC (which lasted two episodes). She also appeared on Hollywood Squares and was a regular panelist for the remake of To Tell the Truth. Poundstone had a recurring role in Cybill Shepherd's TV series Cybill (1997).

Poundstone has also worked as a voice actress. She voiced Judge Stone on Science Court (also known as Squigglevision), an edutainment cartoon series done in the Squigglevision style that aired on Saturday mornings, on ABC Kids in 1997.

Staying with the makers of Science Court, Tom Snyder Productions, she was the voice of the mom, Paula Small, in the cartoon series Home Movies for the show's first five episodes, which aired on UPN. Between the show's 1999 UPN cancellation and 2000 revival on Cartoon Network, Poundstone chose to leave the show and was replaced by Janine Ditullio. 

The show's character, Paula Small, was named and loosely modeled on Poundstone.

Poundstone is a frequent panelist on National Public Radio (NPR)'s weekly news quiz show, Wait Wait... Don't Tell Me. In 2017, she launched a new science-comedy-interview program on NPR called Live from the Poundstone Institute that released episodes weekly, then stopped suddenly, saying “the semester is over”. In July 2018, Poundstone began co-hosting the information-based, comedy podcast "Nobody Listens to Paula Poundstone" with Adam Felber.

Poundstone tours the country extensively, performing stand-up comedy in theaters and performing arts centers. She is known for never doing the same act twice and spontaneously interacting with the crowd. Writes Nick Zaino III of the Boston Globe, "Her crowd work has always been unusual—her natural disposition, curious and ever-perplexed, allows Poundstone to aggressively question audience members without ever seeming threatening. And no one does the callback better." She has released three comedy CDs: I Heart Jokes: Paula Tells Them in Boston  on April Fools' Day 2013; North by Northwest: Paula Poundstone Live! (her first double album) in June 2016; and I Heart Jokes: Paula Tells Them in Maine in January 2009.

Poundstone's first book, There Is Nothing in This Book That I Meant to Say, was published by Crown in 2006. Her second book, published by Algonquin in May 2017, is titled The Totally Unscientific Study of the Search for Human Happiness. She also wrote the column Hey, Paula! for Mother Jones (1993–1998) and articles for The Los Angeles Times, Glamour, and Entertainment Weekly,'' among others.

An avid reader, Poundstone has been the National Spokesperson for the American Library Association's "United for Libraries" since 2007. It is a citizens' support group that works to raise funds and awareness for their local libraries.

Poundstone is No. 88 on Comedy Central's 2004 list of the 100 greatest stand-ups of all time.

Personal life 
Poundstone began serving as a foster parent in the 1990s. She has fostered eight children, and eventually adopted two daughters and a son. 

Poundstone identifies as asexual and an atheist.

Child endangerment charges and legal issues
In October 2001, Poundstone was charged with felony child endangerment in connection with driving while intoxicated with her children in the car. She was also charged with three counts of lewd acts upon a girl younger than 14. The charge involved inappropriate touching of a 12-year-old girl. In a plea bargain, she changed her earlier plea of not guilty, and in exchange prosecutors asked for the court records to be sealed, dropped three counts of committing lewd acts against a child, and added a misdemeanor count of inflicting injury upon a child. Poundstone also pleaded no contest to one count of felony child endangerment. She was barred from taking in foster children again, sentenced to five years of probation and six months in rehabilitation, and ordered to perform 200 hours of community service, attend Alcoholics Anonymous meetings and a child-abuse program, and receive random drug and alcohol tests. In 2002, Poundstone talked about her personal responsibility for the events that led to her arrest and the steps she has taken, including a six-month treatment program for alcoholism, but she said that she did not commit any lewd acts or child abuse.

Filmography

Film

Television

Comedy specials

Stand-up appearances

Discography

Comedy albums

Singles

Compilation appearances

Bibliography

References

External links 

 
 

 

1959 births
Living people
American atheists
American stand-up comedians
American women comedians
American actresses
Asexual women
LGBT actresses
Actors from Huntsville, Alabama
People from Sudbury, Massachusetts
20th-century American comedians
21st-century American comedians
Writers from Huntsville, Alabama
Lincoln-Sudbury Regional High School alumni
20th-century American actresses
21st-century American actresses